Rise of the Snakes (also titled Rise of the Serpentine on DVD release) is the first season of the computer-animated television series Ninjago: Masters of Spinjitzu (titled Ninjago from the eleventh season onward). The series was created by Michael Hegner and Tommy Andreasen. It revolves around the adventures of six teenage ninja who live in the fictional world of Ninjago and fight against the forces of evil. The season aired from 2 December 2011 to 11 April 2012 following the pilot episodes. It is succeeded by the second season, titled Legacy of the Green Ninja. 

Rise of the Snakes introduces the central character Lloyd Garmadon (voiced by Jillian Michaels) and follows the story arc of the character's development to becoming the prophesied Green Ninja. In this season, Lloyd is depicted as a young boy who serves as a minor antagonist to the ninja team. The storyline focuses on his attempts to become an evil warlord by taking control of five Serpentine tribes before turning from the path of evil. Lord Garmadon returns as an unlikely ally of the ninja team, while Pythor P. Chumsworth and a legendary snake named the Great Devourer are introduced as the season's main antagonists. The season also develops the character of Nya as she maintains a secret identity as the mysterious Samurai X.

Voice cast

Main 
 Jillian Michaels as Lloyd Garmadon, the green ninja and Elemental Master of Energy
 Vincent Tong as Kai, the red ninja and Elemental Master of Fire
 Michael Adamthwaite as Jay, the blue ninja and Elemental Master of Lightning
 Brent Miller as Zane, the white ninja and Elemental Master of Ice
 Kirby Morrow as Cole, the black ninja and Elemental Master of Earth
 Kelly Metzger as Nya, Kai's sister
 Paul Dobson as Sensei Wu, the wise teacher of the ninja
 Mark Oliver as Lord Garmadon

Recurring 

 Ian James Corlett as Skales
 Michael Dobson as Pythor P. Chumsworth
Paul Dobson as Acidicus
Mark Oliver as Dr. Julien
Colin Murdock as Ed
Jillian Michaels as Edna
Brian Drummond as Kruncha and Nuckal
Kirby Morrow as Lou
Mackenzie Gray as Mistaké

 Mackenzie Gray as Fangtom
John Novak as Slithraa

Production

Development 
Brothers Dan and Kevin Hageman, who were the writers for the series from its initial launch until the tenth season, developed the idea for the character of Lloyd. Series co-creator Tommy Andreasen stated that Lloyd's story arc as the Green Ninja was conceived immediately after the character was created, although the mystery of the identity of the Green Ninja was built up over the course of ten episodes and finally revealed in the episode titled The Green Ninja.

Animation 
The animation for the first season was produced at Wil Film ApS in Denmark. The season was created with a 22-minute format that would continue until the release of the eleventh season.

Direction 
The episodes for Rise of the Snakes were directed by Justin J. Murphy, Michael Hegner, Martin Skov, and Peter Hausner.

Release 
The first episode of the season titled Rise of the Snakes was released on 2 December 2011 on Cartoon Network. The subsequent episodes were released throughout the following months until the season finale Day of the Great Devourer, which was released on 11 April 2012.

Plot 
When Garmadon is spotted in Jamanakai Village, the ninja instead find his son, Lloyd Garmadon, trying to terrorise the villagers. Kai discovers a scroll that foretells the prophecy of the Green Ninja, who will rise above the others to defeat a dark lord, and wonder which of them will be the chosen one. Lloyd uncovers a tomb containing the Hypnobrai, one of the five Serpentine tribes. The tribe's general Slithraa attempts to hypnotize him, but accidentally gives Lloyd control of the tribe. Lloyd and the Hypnobrai build a treehouse fortress with the aim of conquering Ninjago, but it is destroyed by the ninja. When they return to the Monastery of Spinjitzu, they discover that it has been burned down and find a new home on board Destiny's Bounty. At the Hypnobrai tomb, Skales takes control of the tribe and banishes Lloyd from the tomb.  Seeking revenge, Lloyd uncovers the Fangpyre tomb and makes a deal with the general Fangtom. Lloyd and the Fangpyre plan to attack the Hypnobrai, but when the two Serpentine generals meet, they become allies and Lloyd escapes. Lloyd opens the Anacondrai tomb and finds Pythor inside, who pretends to befriend him. Lloyd is eventually taken into the care of Master Wu on board Destiny's Bounty.

Pythor travels to the two remaining Serpentine tombs in an attempt to unite the five tribes, with the ninja in pursuit. When they reach the Venomari tomb, they are surrounded by Serpentine and saved by the mysterious Samurai X. Pythor declares himself the new snake king and begins to search for the lost city of Ouroborous, which is the prison of a legendary snake named the Great Devourer. When Lloyd gets captured, the ninja try to save him from the Serpentine. One by one, Zane, Jay and Cole unlock their "True Potential" by overcoming personal obstacles and Nya reveals that she is Samurai X. When the four ninja follow the mysterious falcon into the woods, they stumble on a hidden work shop where Zane learns the secret about his past and in the process, he is the first ninja to unlock his true potential. Jay and Nya have to cut their first date in Mega-Monster Amusement Park short as the Serpentine are on their way to retrieve the first or four fang blades to be used to awaken the Great Devourer. The four ninja go undercover as a dance troupe and enter a talent contest in their quest to win "The Blade Cup" where one of the fang blades is hidden.

Pythor begins his search for four silver fangblades, which will awaken the Great Devourer. After finding the first two, the Serpentine attempt to retrieve the third Fangblade at the Fire Temple, but are forced to fight the ninja. Lloyd becomes trapped on a rock in the lava, so Kai decides to save him and consequently unlocks his True Potential. The ninja and Sensei Wu try to infiltrate the Serpentines' inner sanctum and walk right into a trap, and when Lloyd's rescue mission fails, there is only one person who can help them, namely the evil Lord Garmadon.  On board Destiny's Bounty, the four Golden Weapons reveal that Lloyd is destined to be the Green Ninja. The ninja take all four fangblades from the Serpentine base, but Pythor sneaks on board Destiny's Bounty and steals them.  When Pythor releases the Great Devourer, it devours everything in its path, including Pythor. The ninja attempt to stop the snake in Ninjago City and, with no other choice, give the four Golden Weapons to Garmadon, who launches an attack on its weak spot. The Great Devourer explodes into slime and Garmadon disappears with the Golden Weapons.

Episodes

Ratings 
The first season of Ninjago: Masters of Spinjitzu, which was released on Cartoon Network, achieved the top position on Wednesday nights from 7 to 9 pm with children aged 2–11 and 9–14.

Accolades 
Director Peter Hausner was nominated in the category of "Directing in a Television Production" at the Annie Awards in 2012.

Other media 
The season was accompanied by a related app titled Rise of the Snakes, which was released for iOS on 22 March 2012. The game involves fighting as one of the main ninja characters against the Serpentine and includes six battle arenas.

See also 

 List of Ninjago characters
 Lego Ninjago

References

Primary

Secondary

Rise of the Snakes
2011 Canadian television seasons
2011 Danish television seasons
2012 Canadian television seasons
2012 Danish television seasons